A physical disability is a limitation on a person's physical functioning, mobility, dexterity or stamina. Other physical disabilities include impairments which limit other facets of daily living, such as respiratory disorders, blindness, epilepsy and sleep disorders.

Causes 
Prenatal disabilities are acquired before birth. These may be due to diseases or substances that the mother has been exposed to during pregnancy, embryonic or fetal developmental accidents or genetic disorders.

Perinatal disabilities are acquired between some weeks before to up to four weeks after birth in humans. These can be due to prolonged lack of oxygen or obstruction of the respiratory tract, damage to the brain during birth (due to the accidental misuse of forceps, for example) or the baby being born prematurely. These may also be caused due to genetic disorders or accidents.

Post-natal disabilities are gained after birth. They can be due to accidents, injuries, obesity, infection or other illnesses. These may also be caused due to genetic disorders.

Types 
Mobility impairment includes upper or lower limb loss or impairment, poor manual dexterity, and damage to one or multiple organs of the body. Disability in mobility can be a congenital or acquired problem or a consequence of disease. People who have a broken skeletal structure also fall into this category.

Visual impairment is another type of physical impairment. There are hundreds of thousands of people with minor to various serious vision injuries or impairments. These types of injuries can also result in severe problems or diseases such as blindness and ocular trauma. Some other types of vision impairment include scratched cornea, scratches on the sclera, diabetes-related eye conditions, dry eyes and corneal graft, macular degeneration in old age and retinal detachment.

Hearing loss is a partial or total inability to hear. Deaf and hard of hearing people have a rich culture and benefit from learning sign language for communication purposes. People who are only partially deaf can sometimes make use of hearing aids to improve their hearing ability.
Speech and language disability: the person with deviations of speech and language processes which are outside the range of acceptable deviation within a given environment and which prevent full social or educational development

Physical impairment can also be attributed to disorders causing, among others, sleep deficiency, chronic fatigue, chronic pain, and seizures.

See also 
 Mental disability

References

Further reading 
 Danielle Gourevitch & Mirko Grmek. (1998). Les maladies dans l'art antique, Paris.
 
 Mirko Grmek. (1983). Les maladies à l'aube de la civilisation occidentale, Paris.
 

 Phys
Disability